The name Olbracht refers to several people:

 Jan I Olbracht, English John I Albert (1459–1501), King of Poland
 Ivan Olbracht, born Karel Zeman (1882–1952), Czech writer